Brambleton is a census-designated place (CDP) in Loudoun County, Virginia, United States, south of the Dulles Greenway. The population as of the 2010 United States Census was 9,845. In 2017, Brambleton had an estimated population of 19,900, with a median age of 34.3 and a median household income of $173,690. Between 2016 and 2017 the population of Brambleton, VA grew from 17,063 to 19,876, a 16.5% increase and its median household income grew from $164,321 to $173,690, a 5.7% increase. Construction started on the Brambleton community in 2001.

Geography
To the west is rural or low-density suburban land.

The community drains north to Beaverdam Run and east to Broad Run, both part of the Potomac River watershed.

Community design

Brambleton is zoned for a full range of residential and commercial uses. Future commercial parcels are planned within Brambleton.

Brambleton was designed to incorporate traditional neighborhood features alongside pedestrian-oriented spaces and streetscapes. Brambleton is also home to two Winwood childcare centers and two Chesterbrook Academy pre-schools.

History
Brambleton is located at the site of the former community of Royville, which existed as early as 1908 at the intersection of Belmont Ridge Road and Creighton Road. Developing the Brambleton planned community began in earnest in the spring of 1999, immediately after Brambleton Group L.L.C., a division of Soave Real Estate, acquired the property. Road improvements were necessary along Route 607/772 to connect Brambleton via the Loudoun County Parkway to Exit 7 of the Dulles Greenway.

Residents in the development are members of the Brambleton Community Association, a homeowners association.

Town Center
The Town Center of Brambleton contains over 50 retail stores, restaurants, entertainment, doctors, public spaces and commercial offices. The Town Center serves as the location for the community's annual Sizzlin' Summer Concerts, Farmers' Market, Race Brambleton Series and other events and festivals.

Schools

High schools
 Briar Woods High School
 Independence High School

Middle schools
 Brambleton Middle School

Elementary schools
 Creighton's Corner Elementary
 Legacy Elementary School
 Madison's Trust Elementary School

References

External links

Brambleton developer's website
Brambleton Community Association

Populated places established in 2001
Census-designated places in Loudoun County, Virginia
Planned cities in the United States
Census-designated places in Virginia
Washington metropolitan area
2001 establishments in Virginia